Frankenweenie: The Original Motion Picture Soundtrack is the film score for the Disney film, Frankenweenie by Danny Elfman, was released September 25, 2012.

A separate soundtrack concept album titled, Frankenweenie Unleashed!: Music Inspired by the Motion Picture by various artists was also released on the same date. The packaging for Frankenweenie: Unleashed was distributed in a digipak CD format with phosphorescent cover art.

Each album was released by Walt Disney Records physically on CD and via digital download on various online platforms including the iTunes Store.

Frankenweenie (Original Motion Picture Soundtrack)

Track listing

Frankenweenie Unleashed! (Music Inspired by the Motion Picture) 

Only the tracks "Strange Love" and "Praise Be New Holland", are actually used in the film. Artists Grace Potter, Kerli, the Plain White T's, and Robert Smith were previously featured on Almost Alice, a similar compilation album consisting of tracks from and inspired by the Tim Burton film Alice in Wonderland by various artists.

Background 
Karen O was approached by the film's director Tim Burton with the intent of the singer writing a song especially for the film. The singer has said that her song, "Strange Love" was inspired by "the same era of B-movie fright film references sprinkled throughout the film. I went in the direction of exotica and calypso stylistically because it’s quirky, good vibes music of that era, and when you throw in a Theremin solo, it’s a marriage made in heaven. I remember Beetlejuice introducing me to the genius of Harry Belafonte’s calypso record, so I wanted to give a nod to that, too." The brief line “Love, love is strange,” as well as its melody, which are repeated several times in “Strange Love”, are drawn directly from the 1957 #1 hit record, “Love Is Strange” by Mickey & Sylvia.

Track listing

Charts

Personnel 

"Strange Love"
Karen O — vocals
Jaleel Bunton — guitar, ukulele, bass, tambourine, lap steel guitar
Yusuke Yamamoto — vibraphone, percussion, piano, synthesizer
J. G. Thirlwell — Keyboard, electronics

"Electric Heart (Star Forever)"
Neon Trees
Tyler Glenn — vocals, keyboards
Brandon Campbell — bass
Christopher Allen — guitars
Elaine Bradley — drums, backing vocals
Justin Meldal-Johnsen — programming, keyboards

"Polartropic (You Don't Understand Me)"
Mark Foster — production
Isom Innis — mixing

"Pet Sematary"
Dan Monahan — production
Augie Schmidt — production
Joe Zook — mixing

"With My Hands"
Damian Taylor — production, mixing

"Everybody's Got A Secret"
Aaron Bruno — production
Eric Stenman - engineering, mixing

"Immortal"
Kerli — leading and backing vocals
Toby Gad —  instruments, programming
Jon Rezin — electric bass, vocal editing
Josh Cumbee — string programming

"My Mechanical Friend"
Grace Potter — vocals, keyboards, machine noises, engineering
The Flaming Lips
Wayne Coyne — vocals, 
Steven Drozd — bass, drums, guitars
Rich Costey — mixing
Chris Kaysch — assisting
Mack Hawkins — engineering

"Lost Cause"
Imagine Dragons
Dan Reynolds — writer, vocals, recording engineer
Alex Da Kid — writer, producer
Josh Mosser — writer, recording engineer

"Witchcraft"
Robert Smith — voice, instruments

Notes

References

External links

2012 soundtrack albums
Alternative rock compilation albums
Concept albums
Danny Elfman soundtracks
Disney animation soundtracks
Indie rock compilation albums
Industrial rock albums
Punk rock compilation albums
Rock soundtracks
Walt Disney Records compilation albums
Walt Disney Records soundtracks